Apnenik may refer to:

Apnenik pri Boštanju, a settlement in Sevnica, Slovenia
Apnenik pri Velikem Trnu, a settlement in Krško, Slovenia
Apnenik, Šentjernej, a settlement in Šentjernej, Slovenia